Otto H. Luedeke (July 8, 1916 – October 20, 2005) was an American cyclist. He competed in the individual and team road race events at the 1932 Summer Olympics. Luedeke was a veteran of the U.S. Army and is buried in Arlington National Cemetery.

His son, Raymond Luedeke, is a composer and clarinetist, who for many years was Associate Principal Clarinet with the Toronto Symphony Orchestra and who presently lives in New York City, where he is artistic director of Voice Afire Opera-Cabaret.

References

External links
 

1916 births
2005 deaths
American male cyclists
Olympic cyclists of the United States
Cyclists at the 1932 Summer Olympics
Sportspeople from Union City, New Jersey